Calabazar de Sagua, also shortened as Calabazar, is a Cuban village and consejo popular ("people's council", i.e. hamlet) of the municipality of Encrucijada, in Villa Clara Province, Cuba. In 2011 it had a population of 7,912.

History
Founded in 1865, it was part of the neighboring municipality of Sagua la Grande until the 1977 administrative reform.

Geography
Located on a rural plain in the middle of its province, Calabazar lies between Encrucijada (4.5 km southeast), El Purio (4 km northeast) and Mata (4.5&km southwest). It is 17 km from Cifuentes, 30 to Vueltas, 32 to Santa Clara, 37 to Sagua la Grande, 40 to Camajuaní, 50 to Remedios and 58 to Placetas and Caibarién.

Transport
The village is crossed in the middle by the "Circuito Norte" (CN) state highway, the 2nd longest one in the island. It counts a train station, Calabazar-Mata, located in the nearby village of Mata, on the Camajuaní-Encrucijada-Cifuentes (to Sagua) branch line.

On Mondays, Wednesdays, and Fridays at 5:00am buses go to Santa Clara. From Sunday to Friday at 6:30pm and 8:15pm they also go to Santa Clara.

Education 
Schools in Calabazar include: 

 José Martí Primary School
 Antonio Maceo Primary School
 Neptalí Martínez CM
 José Manuel Fuertes Jiménez Special School
 Antonio Guiteras CEA

Notable people
Onelio Jorge Cardoso (1914–1986), writer

See also
Parrandas
Municipalities of Cuba
List of cities in Cuba

References

External links

Calabazar de Sagua Weather on accuweather.com

Populated places in Villa Clara Province
Populated places established in 1865
Sagua la Grande
1865 establishments in North America
1865 establishments in the Spanish Empire